The Coca is a right tributary of the river Slănic in Romania. It discharges into the Slănic in Niculești.

References

Rivers of Romania
Rivers of Buzău County